Carol Fullerton (born December 16, 1949) is a former American politician from Georgia. Fullerton is a Democratic member of Georgia House of Representatives from 2009 to 2015.

References

1949 births
Living people
Democratic Party members of the Georgia House of Representatives